Lim Chi Wing (born 11 April 1995) is a Malaysian badminton player who specifies in playing men's singles. He won a silver medal in the men's team event at the 2017 Southeast Asian Games.

Career 
He started playing badminton when he was 7 before joining the Bukit Jalil Sports School. In 2014, he was called up to the national team. He won his first title at the 2014 Bangladesh International, defeating Subhankar Dey of India with a score of 21–12, 21–17. Later that same year, he won his second career title at the Vietnam International.

Two years later, he would go onto achieve a runner-up position at the India International. He failed to defend his Vietnam International title as he lost to Vietnamese veteran Nguyễn Tiến Minh in 2 games. In August 2019, he left the national team to pursue his career as an independent player. In December 2022, Lim announced his retirement from international badminton to start his new career as a coach after his semifinal loss at the Malaysia International Challenge.

Achievements

BWF International Challenge/Series (2 titles, 2 runners-up) 
Men's Singles

  BWF International Challenge tournament
  BWF International Series tournament
  BWF Future Series tournament

Performance timeline

National team 
 Senior level

Individual competitions 
 Junior level

 Senior level

References

External links
 

1995 births
Living people
Sportspeople from Kuala Lumpur
Malaysian sportspeople of Chinese descent
Malaysian male badminton players
Southeast Asian Games medalists in badminton
Southeast Asian Games silver medalists for Malaysia
Competitors at the 2017 Southeast Asian Games
21st-century Malaysian people